El-Hadji Arona Niang (born August 13, 1985 in Dakar) is a Senegalese professional football player. Currently, he plays in the Championnat de France amateur for Balma SC.

He played on the professional level in Ligue 2 for Stade Reims.

References

External links

1985 births
Living people
Senegalese footballers
Senegalese expatriate footballers
Expatriate footballers in France
Ligue 2 players
Stade de Reims players
US Albi players

Association football forwards